Chopta Bugyal, also known as "Tungnath Bugyal" or "Rohini Bugyal", is a cluster of Bugyals (Himalayan Alpine Meadows) in Chopta, Rudraprayag district of Uttarakhand. Chopta Bugyal is a trekking and camping destination. Chopta Bugyal is surrounded by forests of pine, deodar and rhododendron and is rich in flora and fauna.

Chopta is a tourist destination during the winter as well as the summer months due to the climatic conditions that the area experiences. Chopta Bugyal remains covered with red carpet rhododendron flowers during the months of March and April. Views of Garhwal Himalayas including Nanda Devi and Chaukhamba can be seen from Chopta Bugyal. Tungnath is located approximately three and a half km from Chopta, and Chandrashila peak is located about five km from Chopta.

References

Geography of Uttarakhand
Montane grasslands and shrublands